Sherry Millner (born 1950 in Brooklyn, New York) is an American artist working primarily in video. She has also worked in photography and installation art.

Career 

Millner has been producing films, videos, and photomontages since the mid-1970s. In the 1980s she was part of the first generation of feminist video artists, along with Vanalyne Green and Cecelia Condit. Her work explores motherhood, the family, and its relationship to the militarized State, using a combination of satirical humor, analysis, and personal insight. She often collaborates on videos with her partner, the novelist and media critic Ernest Larsen.

Millner's work has been included in numerous exhibitions at venues such as the Whitney Museum of American Art (including two consecutive Whitney Biennial exhibitions), The Museum of Modern Art, and the Institute of Contemporary Art. In 2011, her work was included with that of Superflex, Libia Castro, Ólafur Ólafsson and others in an international exhibition curated by Oliver Ressler and Gregory Sholette, It's the Political Economy, Stupid: The Global Financial Crisis in Art and Theory. The exhibition travelled to venues in New York, Chicago, Vienna, Greece, Finland, Serbia, and Croatia. In 2013, her work was included with that of Jeremy Deller, Mike Figgis and others in Economy, an exhibition which travelled to the Stills Gallery in Edinburgh and the Centre for Contemporary Arts in Glasgow.

Her photomontages have been reproduced in many journals and anthologies; she was represented along with Barbara Kruger, Susan Meiselas, Carrie Mae Weems, and others in Diane Neumaier's anthology, Reframings: New American Feminist Photographies (Temple University Press, 1995). She has received grants and fellowships from the New York Foundation for the Arts, the Jerome Foundation, the NYSCA, Long Beach Museum of Art, and the Ucross Foundation, among others. Her work has been widely reviewed and referenced by critics and art historians in books, journals, and periodicals.

Millner has taught media courses at City University of New York, the New York Arts Practicum, and elsewhere. In recent years she has focused on curation. In January 2016, she and Larsen  released the first of a three-disc DVD set that forms a curated history of the films of political resistance: Disruptive Film: Everyday Resistance to Power, Vol. 1. This was based on their work as curators of the "Border-Crossers and Trouble-Makers" program at the Oberhausen Film Festival in 2008. They also programmed the 2013 Robert Flaherty Film Seminar.

Filmography 
Millner's work is distributed by Video Data Bank.

Selected exhibitions 

 1987: CalArts: Skeptical Belief(s), Renaissance Society, Chicago
 1987: Biennial Exhibition, Whitney Museum of American Art, New York
 1988: Investigations 27: Fast Forward, New Video, Institute of Contemporary Art, Philadelphia
 1989: Biennial Exhibition, Whitney Museum of American Art, New York
 1989: Sherry Millner Retrospective at The Kitchen, New York
 1989: Literacy on the Table: Cultural Fluency and the Act of Reading, Hallwalls Contemporary Arts Center, Buffalo
 1989: Social Engagement: Women's Video in the 80's (New American Filmmakers Series), Whitney Museum of American Art, New York 
 1990: Image World, Whitney Museum of American Art, New York
 1990: Video and Myth, The Museum of Modern Art, New York
 1990: The Decade Show: Frameworks of Identity in the 1980s, New York, The New Museum
 1992: Re-Mapping Cultures, Whitney Museum of American Art, New York
 1993: Video Viewpoints, The Museum of Modern Art, New York
 1998: New Documentary Film & Video, The Museum of Modern Art, New York
 2011: It’s the Political Economy, Stupid: The Global Financial Crisis in Art and Theory, traveling exhibition
 2013: Economy, Edinburgh, Glasgow

Publications

References

Further reading 

 
 

Living people
1950 births
American women video artists
American video artists
American women installation artists
American installation artists
Feminist artists
People from Brooklyn
21st-century American women photographers
21st-century American photographers